Roman Holiday is a 1953 film starring Audrey Hepburn and Gregory Peck.

Roman Holiday may also refer to:

Film, television, and theatre 
 Roman Holiday (1987 film), an American television film based on the 1953 film
 Roman Holiday (2017 film), a South Korean film directed by Lee Duk-hee
 "Roman Holiday" (Gossip Girl), an episode of Gossip Girl
 The Roman Holidays, a 1972 American animated television series
 Roman Holiday (musical), a musical play based on the 1953 film

Music

Performers 
 Roman Holiday (band), an American alternative-rock band since 2008
 Roman Holliday, a 1980s British swing and pop band

Songs 
 "Roman Holiday" (song), by Nicki Minaj, 2012
 "Roman Holiday", written by Norman Malkin and Margie Rayburn, 1963
 "Roman Holiday", by Halsey from Badlands, 2015
 "Roman Holiday", by The National from I Am Easy to Find, 2019
 "Roman Holiday", by Every Time I Die from New Junk Aesthetic, 2009
 "Roman Holiday", by Fontaines D.C. from Skinty Fia, 2022

Literature 
 Roman Holiday (novel), a 1931 novel by Upton Sinclair
 "Roman Holiday", the eleventh issue of the Batman: The Long Halloween limited series
 RWBY: Roman Holiday, a 2021 RWBY novel by E. C. Myers

Other uses 
 "Roman holiday", an English expression of Schadenfreude

See also
 Roman festivals, holidays in ancient Rome